Marc Laffineur (born 10 August 1945) in Maubeuge is a French politician.  He was a member of the National Assembly of France from 1988 to 2011, representing the Maine-et-Loire department,  and is a member of the Union for a Popular Movement (UMP).

On 29 June 2011 he was appointed Minister of Veteran Affairs.

References

1945 births
Living people
People from Maubeuge
Union for French Democracy politicians
Liberal Democracy (France) politicians
Union for a Popular Movement politicians
Modern and Humanist France
Secretaries of State of France
Deputies of the 12th National Assembly of the French Fifth Republic
Deputies of the 13th National Assembly of the French Fifth Republic
Deputies of the 14th National Assembly of the French Fifth Republic